Doo Lough is a freshwater lake in the Mid-West Region of Ireland. It is located in County Clare.

Geography

Natural history
Doo Lough is a brown trout fishing destination. The lake is located just north of the Cragnashingaun Bogs Natural Heritage Area.

See also
List of loughs in Ireland

References

Doo